Cankurd, (born 1948 in Maydan), is a contemporary Kurdish poet and writer.

Due to his political activism, he was imprisoned several times, until he left Syria for Germany in 1979. He writes in Kurdish, Arabic and German. He has translated some of the literary works of Shakespeare and Daphne du Maurier into Kurdish. He has also translated some poets of the contemporary Arab poet Nizar Qabbani into Kurdish.

Books
 Gundê Dîna, Short story in Kurdish, Helwest Publishers, Sweden, /9189224094.
 Selahdînê Eyûbî: Kurdekî Cîhan Hejand, Helwest-Çanda Nûjen Publishers, Spånga, Sweden, 60 pp., 2000. /9189224051.
 Alexander Jaba (Berhevoka çêrokên kurmancî), First edition, Helwest Publishers, Spånga, 135 pp., 2000.
 Dilopeka xwîna dila, Poem.
 Bazirganê Vênîsiya,  Translation of The Merchant of Venice by Shakespeare.

References

External links
 

1948 births
Date of birth missing (living people)
Kurdish-language writers
Living people
Syrian expatriates in Germany
Syrian translators
Translators of William Shakespeare
Translators to Kurdish